Polyzoniidae is a family of millipedes in the order Polyzoniida. There are about 9 genera and at least 60 described species in Polyzoniidae.

Genera
 Angarozonium
 Bdellozonium Cook & Loomis, 1928
 Buzonium Cook & Loomis, 1928
 Petaserpes Cope, 1870
 Pizonium
 Platyulus
 Polyzonium
 Siphonotus
 Stenozonium Shelley, 1998

References

Further reading

 
 
 
 

Polyzoniida
Millipede families